Kiplagat (also Kiplangat) is a personal name used by the Kalenjin people in Kenya and Uganda, meaning son born at dawn. The son of Kiplagat would be lagat. This may also mean:

Benjamin Kiplagat (born 1989), Ugandan steeplechase runner
Bisluke Kiplagat (born 1988), Kenyan steeplechase runner
Boaz Kiplagat Lalang (born 1989), Kenyan middle-distance runner and 2010 Commonwealth Games champion
Edna Kiplagat (born 1979), Kenyan long-distance runner and two-time world marathon champion
Florence Kiplagat (born 1987), Kenyan long-distance runner and half marathon world record breaker
Hosea Kiplagat, Kenyan businessman and politician
Hosea Kiplagat Kosgei (born 1989), Kenyan long-distance track runner competing for Bahrain as Aadam Ismaeel Khamis
Isiah Kiplangat Koech (born 1993), Kenyan long-distance track runner and World Championships medallist
Kiptanui Kiplagat Jackson, Kenyan politician representing the Orange Democratic Movement
James Kiplagat Magut (born 1990), Kenyan middle-distance runner
Julius Kiplagat Yego (born 1989), Kenyan javelin thrower
Lornah Kiplagat (born 1974), Dutch-Kenyan long-distance runner and multiple half marathon world champion
Peter Kiplagat Chebet (born 1974), Kenyan marathon runner
Silas Kiplagat (born 1989), Kenyan middle-distance runner and 2011 World Championships runner-up
Vincent Kiplangat Kosgei (born 1985), Kenyan Olympic 400 metres hurdler
William Kiplagat (born 1972), Kenyan long-distance runner and 2003 Amsterdam Marathon winner
Kiplang'at Kiboi Sakong' (born 1984), Linguist and human rights activist

See also
Langat (surname), a related Kalenjin surname

Kalenjin names
Patronymic surnames